MoMA PS1 is a contemporary art institution located in Court Square in the Long Island City neighborhood in the borough of Queens, New York City. In addition to its exhibitions, the institution organizes the Sunday Sessions performance series, the Warm Up summer music series, and the Young Architects Program with the Museum of Modern Art. MoMA PS1 has been affiliated with the Museum of Modern Art since January 2000 and, attracts about 200,000 visitors a year.

History

Founding
What would become MoMA PS1 was founded in 1971 by Alanna Heiss as the Institute for Art and Urban Resources Inc., an organization with the mission of turning abandoned, underutilized buildings in New York City into artist studios and exhibition spaces.

Recognizing that New York was a worldwide magnet for contemporary artists, and believing that traditional museums were not providing adequate exhibition opportunities for site-specific art, in 1971 Heiss established a formal, alternative arts organization with architecture/theater critic Brendan Gill called The Institute for Art and Urban Resources, and began renovating abandoned buildings in New York City.

In 1976, Heiss opened the P.S. 1 Contemporary Art Center in a deserted Romanesque Revival public school building, exponentially increasing the organization's exhibition and studio capacity. This building, dating from 1892, served as the first school in Long Island City until 1963, when the First Ward school it housed was closed due to low attendance and the building was turned into a warehouse.

In October 1997, P.S.1 Contemporary Art Center reopened to the public after a three-year, $8.5 million renovation project designed by Los Angeles-based architecture firm Frederick Fisher & Partners. The building's facilities were increased from 84,000 to 125,000 square feet in order to include a large outdoor gallery, a dramatic entryway, and a two-story project space.

In February 1999, P.S. 1 Contemporary Art Center and the Museum of Modern Art announced their institutional merger, which was stated to take 10 years and designed to preserve P.S. 1 as a center of independent experimentation and exploration.

Affiliation with the Museum of Modern Art
MoMA PS1 and the Museum of Modern Art formalized their affiliation in January 2000.
New York City, which owns the MoMA PS1 building, endorsed the merger. The principal objective of MoMA's partnership with MoMA PS1 is to promote the enjoyment, appreciation, study, and understanding of contemporary art to a wide and growing audience. Collaborative programs of exhibitions, educational activities, and special projects allow both institutions to draw on their respective strengths and resources and to continue shaping a cultural discourse. The two institutions also integrated their development, education, marketing, financial planning and membership departments. To mark the 10th anniversary of the merger between the former P.S. 1 Contemporary Art Center and MoMA, the museum changed its name to MoMA PS1 in 2010.

Later development
In 2008, following the completion of a 10-year merger process with MoMA, Alana Heiss retired as director of P.S. 1 Contemporary Art Center after 36 years. In 2009, Klaus Biesenbach was named Director of the renamed MoMA PS1. Biesenbach had first joined at PS1 as a curator in 1997, and subsequently held the positions of Curator in MoMA's Department of Film and Media and Chief Curator of MoMA's Department of Media and Performance Art. Biesenbach left the museum for the Museum of Contemporary Art in Los Angeles in July 2018, leaving the museum temporarily without a director. In November 2018, MoMA PS1 art handlers demonstrated outside the museum to earn the same pay as similar workers at MoMA in Manhattan, and in March 2019, the museum paid a settlement with a curator who accused the museum of rescinding a job offer due to pregnancy. In June 2019, Kate Fowle was announced as the museum's new director. In November 2019, a new restaurant opened in the museum.

Following a longer than initially expected closure for the coronavirus pandemic, on April 13, 2020, MoMA PS1 told its employees there would be furloughs due to the museum facing its "most serious financial crisis" ever, with impact to be felt "for years to come," according to director Kate Fowle. 70% of the museum's workforce was furloughed, leaving 17 employees working at the museum. In June 2020, the museum and the Brooklyn Museum were the only two major art institutions to participate in the Open Your Lobby initiative, which asks businesses to provide protestors with shelter or resources.

Programs, installations, and events

Artist and exhibition programs

From its inception, MoMA PS1 has championed the innovative and the experimental. The premiere exhibition, Rooms, held in June 1976, featured the works of 78 artists, many of whom created site-specific installations in the former classrooms. For Rooms, the sculptor Alan Saret cut a tiny hole in one wall, creating an almost heavenly aureole of light at one end of the third-floor hallway. The museum has featured the works of the artists Janet Cardiff, David Hammons, Kimsooja, Hilma af Klint, Donald Lipski, John McCracken, Dennis Oppenheim, Michelangelo Pistoletto, Alan Saret, Katharina Sieverding, Keith Sonnier, Michael Tracy, Franz West, Maria Lassnig, Judy Rifka, and Peter Young. Its landmark survey of Mike Kelley in 2013 was the largest exhibition of the artist's work at the time. A focus has been on outsider artists such as Henry Darger, who was included in "Disasters of War: Francisco de Goya, Henry Darger, Jake and Dinos Chapman" (2000). "Greater New York," a survey of emerging artists working in New York City, was established in 2000 and is mounted every five years. Many exhibitions organized by MoMA PS1 travel to museums in the United States and abroad, including collaborations with Kunst-Werke Institute for Contemporary Art in Berlin.

In November 2019, the Trump administration travel ban resulted in denied visas to a number of Iraqi artists taking part in MoMA PS1's "Theater of Operations: The Gulf Wars 1991–2011" exhibitions, resulting in criticism by activists.

Throughout its history, MoMA PS1 has routinely organized exhibitions outside of its building, including street performances throughout New York City, projects in the Rockaways, and international exhibitions and projects.

Important exhibitions hosted since the founding of MoMA PS1 in 1976 include:
 Rooms (June 9–26, 1976)
 Afro-American Abstraction (February 17 – April 6, 1980)
 Ted Stamm: Paintings 1972–1980 (February 11 – March 7, 1981)
 West/East: First Generation Environmental Sculptures (September 28, 1980 - March 14, 1982)
 New York/New Wave (February 15 – April 5, 1981)
 The Knot: Arte Povera at P.S. 1 (October 6 – December 15, 1985)
 James Turrell: "Meeting" (October 26, 1986 - [ongoing])
 John McCracken: Heroic Stance, A Survey of Sculpture 1965–1986 (October 26 – December 26, 1986)
 Michelangelo Pistoletto: Division and Multiplication of the Mirror (October 2 – November 27, 1988)
 Franz West (1989)
 David Hammons: Rousing the Rubble, 1969 - 1990 (December 16, 1990 - February 10, 1991)
 Dennis Oppenheim: And the Mind Grew Fingers (December 8, 1991 - February 9, 1992)
 Jack Smith: Flaming Creature (October 29, 1997 - March 1, 1998)
 Gordon Matta-Clark: Reorganizing Structure by Drawing Through It (April 26 – August 30, 1998)
 Inside Out: New Chinese Art (1998)
 Minimalia: An Italian Vision in 20th Century Art (October 10, 1999 - January 9, 2000)
 Children of Berlin: Cultural Developments 1989 - 1999 (November 7, 1999 - January 2, 2000)
 Greater New York (February 27 – May 30, 2000)
 Disasters of War: Goya, Henry Darger, Jake and Dinos Chapman (November 19, 2000 - February 25, 2001)
 Janet Cardiff: A Survey of Works (October 14, 2001 - January 31, 2002)
 Mexico City: An Exhibition about the Exchange Rates of Bodies and Values (June 30 – September 10, 2002)
 Roth Time: A Dieter Roth Retrospective (March 12 – June 7, 2004)
 Katharina Sieverding: Close Up (October 24, 2004 - January 23, 2005)
 Peter Hujar (October 23, 2005 - April 10, 2006)
 Into Me/Out of Me (June 25 – September 25, 2006)
 Wack! Art and the Feminist Revolution (February 17 – May 12, 2008)
 Lutz Bacher My Secret Life (February 12 – September 14, 2009)
 September 11 (September 11, 2011 - January 9, 2012)
 Mike Kelley (October 13, 2013 - February 2, 2014)
 James Lee Byars: 1/2 an Autobiography (June 15 – September 7, 2014)
 Maria Lassnig (March 9 – September 7, 2014)
Anne Imhof: DEAL (January 31 – March 9, 2015)
 Greater New York (October 11, 2015 – March 7, 2016)
 Vito Acconci: Where Are We Now (Who Are We Anyway) (June 19 – September 18, 2016)
 Mark Leckey: Containers and Their Drivers (October 23, 2016 – March 5, 2017)
 Carolee Schneemann: Kinetic Painting (October 22, 2017 – March 11, 2018)
 Bruce Nauman: Disappearing Acts (October 21, 2018 – February 25, 2019)
 Marking Time: Art in the Age of Mass Incarceration (September 17, 2020 – April 04, 2021)

Young Architects Program
The Young Architects Program (YAP) is an annual competition hosted by MoMA PS1 and The Museum of Modern Art that invites young architects to submit design proposals for MoMA PS1's courtyard. The winning entry is converted from concept to construction and becomes the architectural setting for MoMA PS1's summer Warm Up music series. The Young Architects program was placed on a one-year hiatus in late 2019.

YAP winners include:
 1998 – untitled? by Gelatin'
 1999 – DJ Pavilion by Philip Johnson
 2000 – Dunescape by SHoP Architects
 2001 –  Summer Oasis by ROY (principal Lindy Roy)
 2002 – Playa Urbana / Urban Beach by William E. Massie
 2003 –  Light-Wing by EMERGENT (principal, Tom Wiscombe)
 2004 – Canopy by nARCHITECTS (principals, Eric Bunge and Mimi Hoang)
 2005 – SUR by Xefirotarch (principal, Hernan Diaz Alonso)
 2006 – BEATFUSE! by Obra Architects
 2007 – Liquid Sky by Ball-Nogues Studio
 2008 – Public Farm 1 by WorkAC (principals, Amale Andraos and Dan Wood)
 2009 – Afterparty by MOS Architects (principals, Michael Meredith and Hilary Sample)
 2010 – Pole Dance by Solid-Objectives – Idenburg Liu
 2011 – Holding Pattern by Interboro Partners & WHATAMI by stARTT (MAXXI, Rome)
 2012 – Wendy by HWKN (principals, Matthias Hollwich and Marc Kushner)
 2013 – Party Wall by CODA (principal, Caroline O'Donnell)
 2014 – Hy-Fi by The Living (principal, David Benjamin)
 2015 – COSMO by Andrés Jaque
 2016 – Weaving the Courtyard by Escobedo Soliz Studio
 2017 – Lumen by Jenny Sabin Studio
2018 – Hide & Seek by Dream the Combine

Warm Up

Warm Up is MoMA PS1's music series summer event. The series is housed within the architectural installation created by the winner of the annual Young Architects Program. Together, the music, architecture and exhibition program provide a unique multi-sensory experience for music fans, artists, and families alike.

Warm Up was conceived in 1997 as a summer-long dance party to bring new audiences to MoMA PS1 and Long Island City, Queens. The series runs every Saturday from July through early September and draws thousands of local and international visitors each day.

Highlights from the series include a notable group of international DJs and live music ensembles: DJ Harvey, Groove Collective, Afrika Bambaataa, Mad Professor, Richie Hawtin, François K, Fischerspooner, Kid Koala, Arto Lindsay, Scissor Sisters, Luke Vibert, Solange, Jamie XX, Grimes, Arca, Black Dice, Four Tet, DJ Premier, Derrick May, Venus X, Cardi B, Lizzo, and many more.

Long-term installations
MoMA PS1 houses several long-term installations throughout the building:
 A large outdoor dome used for house exhibitions, as of 2013
 Richard Artschwager, Blips, 1976. Location: Throughout MoMA PS1
 Richard Artschwager, Exit - Don't fight City Hall, 1976. Location: First floor
 Richard Serra, Untitled, 1976. Location: Rooftop
 Alan Saret, Hole at PS1: Fifth Solar Chtonich Wall Temple, 1976. Location: Third floor, eastern end of north wing
 Lawrence Weiner, A bit of matter and a little bit more, 1976. Location: Front door, stenciled on glass
 James Turrell, Meeting, 1986. Location: Third floor
 Pipilotti Rist, Selbstlos im Lavabad (Selfless in the Bath of Lava), 1994. Location: Lobby, single-channel video installation
 Matt Mullican, Untitled, 1997. Location: Steel inset in basement floor
 Cecily Brown, Untitled, 1997. Location: Staircase B
 Alexis Rockman, Untitled, 1997. Location: Staircase B
 Sol LeWitt, Crayola Square, 1999. Location: Basement floor
 William Kentridge, Stair Procession, 2000. Location: Staircase B
 Ernesto Caivano, In the Woods. 2004, Location: Staircase A
 Abigail Lazkoz, Cameraman, 2005. Location: Staircase B
  Saul Melman, Central Governor, 2010. Location: Basement Boiler Room
 James Ferraro, Saint Prius, 2014. Location: Throughout MoMA PS1 (and available to download from the museum website)

Management

Under chairwoman Agnes Gund, in 2010 the MoMA PS1's board of directors included the artists Cindy Sherman and Mickalene Thomas, art historian Diana Widmaier-Picasso, fashion designer Adam Kimmel, and art collectors Adrian Cheng and Peter Norton. In 2020, an open letter by artists asked the museum to remove Larry Fink and Leon Black from the MoMA PS1 board for their investment history. MoMA PS1 "receives about eight percent of its operating budget from the city" in 2019. As owner of the MoMA PS1 building, New York City contributes to MoMA PS1's annual operating budget. Exhibitions at MoMA PS1 are funded by the Annual Exhibition Fund, which draws donations from trustees.

References

External links

 
 The Museum of Modern Art official website
 MoMA PS1 on ABC News: Emergency Room

Contemporary art galleries in the United States
Art museums established in 1971
Museum of Modern Art (New York City)
Museums in Queens, New York
Art museums and galleries in New York City
1971 establishments in New York City
Long Island City